Eric Lopez is an American voice actor of Mexican descent. His roles include Blue Beetle in Young Justice and Bumblebee Man in The Simpsons.

Career

In 2020, Eric Lopez worked in The Simpsons where he became the new voice of Bumblebee Man in light of the George Floyd protests.

Filmography

Film

Television

Video games

Audiobooks

References

External links
 

Living people
American male video game actors
American male voice actors
Place of birth missing (living people)
Year of birth missing (living people)
American male actors of Mexican descent